Høyjord is a minor village in the municipality of Sandefjord, Norway, with a population of 379 as of 2005. It is famous for the Høyjord Stave Church. Høyjord, which was part of the former municipality of Andebu, was transferred along with Andebu into Sandefjord on 1 January 2017. Some Høyjord residents wanted the village transferred to neighbouring Re, but the village was ultimately merged into Sandefjord. The village is home to an elementary school, kindergarten, and various sports and youth organizations. Illestadvannet Lake is used for recreation and swimming. It is also home to the only stave church still found in Vestfold County.

Høyjord's population was 385 as of 2020 and the village had a total area of 0.4 km2 according to Statistics Norway. Its name derives from the Old Norse “Haugagerði.” The Medieval stave church in Høyjord is the only stave church in Vestfold and one of three remaining center post churches (midtmastkirke) in Norway. The stave church is commonly dated to around the year 1300, however, parts of the church were constructed in the 1100s and in 1275.

Høyjord, pronounced "Høyjol", derives from the farm name Haugagerði, which means "fenced-in land of several mounds." The village name was previously written Haughagiaurdi (in 1374), Haughagiorde (1400), Haagiord and Haajord (1593), and later Høijord and Høyjord.

References 

Villages in Vestfold og Telemark
Andebu